Sarleinsbach is a municipality in the district of Rohrbach in the Austrian state of Upper Austria.

Geography
Sarleinsbach lies in the upper Mühlviertel. About 35 percent of the municipality is forest, and 58 percent is farmland.

References

Cities and towns in Rohrbach District